Universal class is a category derived from the philosophy of Hegel, redefined and popularized by Karl Marx. In Marxism it denotes that class of people within a stratified society for which, at a given point in history, self-interested action coincides with the needs of humanity as a whole.

Hegel 
Hegel believed that history was a movement tending towards the realization of "freedom" (although there is much debate over precisely what Hegel means by freedom) – which, in his own historical moment, he had held his own society to represent, or at least represent the beginning of. For Hegel, divisions and conflicts between people were the external appearance of the internal tensions which drive the development of Spirit. Conflict and its resolution were the ratchet by which human progress was driven steadily forwards – he once famously described Napoleon Bonaparte as "the World Spirit on horseback". Accordingly: having arrived at the end of history, these divisions were to be reconciled by the new "universal class" of state bureaucrats, who acted at all times to reconcile conflicts of interest and acted only in the best interests of the entire society. He also believed in the universal class as an end product.

Further reading 
 Marx's immediate analysis of the unrest in France, 1848-1850
 18th Brumaire of Louis Napoleon, Marx, 1852
 The civil war in France, Marx, 1871

Marxist theory